Mélange Lavonne is an American rapper.

Early life
Lavonne was born and raised in Rialto, California and attended high school at Eisenhower H.S. She was diagnosed with Hodgkin's disease at age 11, but recovered to play basketball in high school, and her experience with cancer, going through chemotherapy and radiation while her parents were going through a divorce and her grandmother who living with them dying of breast cancer changed her. One of her favorite things while Melange was home schooled and had to stay indoors because of her weak immune system, she would spend hours in her dying grandmother's room watching "Golden Girls". Melange states "at 11 I didn't get the adult humor of the show, but as I got older after my grandma passed years later I started to watch and its my all time favorite show, I can appreciate the humor and understand why my grandma loved it. My regret was not meeting any of the actresses before they passed, especially  Betty White".

Melange is also a huge fan of Game of Thrones, and has stated in order to sleep at night she plays the seasons or audio books in order to fall alseep every night, and even on a princess cruise ship vacation trip she won the Game of Thrones trivia challenge. Melange Lavonne states "I'm such an easy calm mild tempered person, but if you bring up season 8 of Game of Thrones I can get really irritated vocally with the dislike of the rushed storylines and bad writing." Before her best friend Abicus who taught her how to rap suddenly died in 2021, he was in the process of surprising her with buying her a Game of Thrones tour cruise where they take you to the sites of the set locations around the world where they filmed the scenes.

Her bestfriend Abicus, real name Kaelon Kroft died of a heart attack suddenly in 2021. Prior in 2020, her other bestfriend Robert King aka King beats who produced all her albums died of renal cell Carcinoma. In 2022 her father Victor Grady died from complications of heart disease and with her losses this led her into writing again after giving up hip hop for years. Her hurt and grief inspired her to continue to make music. She was diagnosed with thyroid cancer in her mid-twenties. In her late thirties she was diagnosed with breast cancer. She's struggled with chronic depression and finds solace in working out in the gym, painting, 3D wood puzzles or hiking outdoors in the Palm Springs area.

Career
Her song, "Gay Bash", delved into the death of her fictional best friend Kevin at the hands of gay bashers. A compelling music video (directed by Camrin Pitts) of the song was made which made it onto MTV LOGO in 2007, where it received frequent rotation, making it a staple on their Top Ten list called "The Click List" throughout the summer of 2007-08 and the year end Top Ten for their New Now Next music show.

Her video "Gay Parenting" also known as "I've Got You" was in heavy rotation on MTV LOGO climbing the charts from 2008 into 2009 on their Top Ten Click List. Her 2008 Album "The Movement" establishes Lavonne's blend of conscious and intelligent hip hop rap, taking on the foes of equality and justice. Her songs tackle issues such as Gay Parenting, Domestic Abuse, AIDS, the Presidential campaigns, discrimination, Global Warming, and hip hop hypocrisy, to name a few.

Audiences may have recently seen her at Dinah Shore, and the winner for the Dinah Idol competition winning the opportunity to open up for Katy Perry & the band Uh Huh Her. She has also toured nationwide including Portland, OR. Pride, NYC Pride Rally, San Francisco Pride, Washington DC Pride, Long Beach Pride, Boston Pride, and Palm Springs Pride where she currently resides. She made her Tri-State area debut in 2009 in New Jersey Performing Arts Center in Newark as part of OUT LOUD PROUD II at NJPAC. She was named "Who's Who in Gay Black America" by BET.COM in 2009 along with elected officials, mayors, athletes and directors and political commentators.

She finished up filming in 2010 for UCLA Research Center in Partnership with Nokia for an interactive music video and short film application for their new phone app.  Rachel Powell, a well-known writer in the entertainment industry, brought her friend Ms. Lavonne in on the project and Nokia fell in love with Ms. Lavonne's song, "Haterz".  They constructed the music video and the film around Ms. Lavonne's on-stage persona.

In 2013, she worked on her studio album A Walk in My Shoes. She has done work in acting starring in a Pilot Series called "Don't Go" where she plays the butch character Jaden, directed by Amber Sharp. Melange Lavonne states, "Working with Amber and the entire crew was an amazing experience, I felt like a fish out of water because I'm a terrible actress realizing this after watching the pilot. But I'm thankful the cast a crew at least gave me an opportunity and I got a chance to see the professionalism of making a film and the hard work behind it what Amber and crew accomplished. I Guess it's one more thing I can check off my bucket list."

Gay Bash
Lavonne's 2008 song "Gay Bash" featured on Logo TV's Click List, a showcase for LBGT short films. "Gay Bash" tells the story of Kevin, a fictional gay man murdered by gay bashers. It was directed by Little Red Pictures, with Lavonne as executive producer. As well as performing well on the Click List, the song was in January 2009 listed on AfterEllen.com'''s sampler of "songs from the new breed of out artists who are blazing a trail for a whole new generation, who aren't afraid to be overtly political or sexual". It was also played at the London Lesbian and Gay Film Festival as a short before the Queen Latifah movie Life Support.

Studio albums
Lavonne's first album, The Movement'', was released in 2008. The album was produced by King Beats-based out of La Quinta, CA.  The album's lyrics manifest Lavonne's political views: the track "Sick Sad World" decries racism, abuse, poverty, anorexia and prejudice. "The Game" attacks hip-hop culture itself as misogynistic and homophobic, saying "the music industry is a pimp and they see you as a ho. "I Got You" addresses gay parenting and "Future President" considers the political future of the United States. The album addresses further themes of domestic violence, AIDS, gang culture, and climate change. She has released singles every year independently on spotify and is currently working on a full album in 2023.

Tours
Lavonne toured as part of HomoRevolution Tour, the first LBGT hip-hop tour in 2007 and 2008. Performed Pride SF, Long Beach Pride, Portland Pride, DC pride, NY pride, 
Connecticut University, LA Pride, Palm Springs Pride, won an online video voting competition for a chance to perform at Dinah Shore Weekend, and Melange Lavonne opened up for "uh huh her" and Katy Perry "NJ conference, several University panel's talking of lgbt in music

Personal life
Melange is still active in the music industry as a writer and producer, and also works in the Healthcare field. She enjoys the sunshine and life in Palm Springs and is involved in the Palm Springs LGBT community. She also loves sport bikes, loves riding her Kawasaki Ninja around the desert. Melange Lavonne states,"Before I die, I'd like to do everything on my bucket list and even the things not listed on it. They say life is short but Life is actually the longest thing we'll ever do."

References

External links 
  Official website

Living people
American lesbian musicians
American women rappers
African-American women rappers
LGBT African Americans
American LGBT rights activists
LGBT people from California
People from Rialto, California
Rappers from California
Activists from California
21st-century American rappers
21st-century American women musicians
Year of birth missing (living people)
LGBT rappers
20th-century LGBT people
21st-century LGBT people
21st-century African-American women
21st-century African-American musicians
21st-century women rappers